Rodey is a census-designated place and colonia in Doña Ana County, New Mexico, United States. Its population was 388 as of the 2010 census. The community is located on the southeast border of Hatch along New Mexico State Road 185.

Geography

Demographics

Education
It is zoned to Hatch Valley Public Schools.

References

Census-designated places in New Mexico
Census-designated places in Doña Ana County, New Mexico